WIJR (880 AM) is a radio station broadcasting a Regional Mexican format. Licensed to Highland, Illinois, United States, it serves the St. Louis, Missouri area.  The station is currently owned by Birach Broadcasting Corporation.

WIJR's studios are located on Hampton Avenue in St. Louis, while its transmitter is located near Highland. They use a directional signal, aimed towards St. Louis, due to avoid interference from WLS-AM in Chicago, further north into Illinois.

History
WIJR was previously WINU until February 6, 2001, when it changed callsigns to WCBW. WCBW was changed to WIJR on August 15, 2006.

References

External links
 

Mexican-American culture in Illinois
Regional Mexican radio stations in the United States
IJR
Madison County, Illinois
IJR
Radio stations established in 1992
Birach Broadcasting Corporation stations